Siratus guionneti is a species of sea snail, a marine gastropod mollusk in the family Muricidae, the murex snails or rock snails.

Description
The shell size varies between 35 mm and 60 mm.

Distribution
This species occurs in the Caribbean Sea and the Lesser Antilles.

References

 Merle D., Garrigues B. & Pointier J.-P. (2011) Fossil and Recent Muricidae of the world. Part Muricinae. Hackenheim: Conchbooks. 648 pp.
 Houart, R. (2014). Living Muricidae of the world. Muricinae. Murex, Promurex, Haustellum, Bolinus, Vokesimurex and Siratus. Harxheim: ConchBooks. 197 pp.
 Garrigues B . & Lamy D. 2018, 218. Muricidae récoltés au cours de la campagne KARUBENTHOS 2 du MNHN dans les eaux profondes de Guadeloupe (Antilles Françaises) et description de trois nouvelles espèces des genres Pagodula et Pygmaepterys (Mollusca, Gastropoda). Xenophora Taxonomy 20: 34-52

External links
 
 Merle D., Garrigues B. & Pointier J.-P. 2001. An analysis of the sculptural pattern of the shell in Caribbean members of Chicoreus (Siratus) Jousseaume, 1880 (Gastropoda, Muricidae), with description of a new species. Zoosystema 23(3): 417-431

Muricidae
Gastropods described in 2001